Isidro Sandoval (born 15 May 1959) is a Paraguayan former footballer who played as a sweeper and centre back.

Honours

Club
 Guaraní
 Paraguayan Primera División: 1984

References

External links
 
 

1959 births
Living people
Paraguayan footballers
Paraguay international footballers
Club Guaraní players
Cerro Porteño players
Club Atlético Vélez Sarsfield footballers
Sport Colombia footballers
Club Tacuary footballers
Association football defenders